Klubi Futbollistik Llapi, commonly known as Llapi, is a professional football club based in Podujevë, Kosovo. The club play in the Football Superleague of Kosovo, which is the top tier of football in the country.

History
KF Llapi was founded on 5 July 1932, becoming the oldest club in Podujevë. The club was known as FK Lab during Yugoslav period.

Reorganization
In 2013, KF Llapi with the aim of better organization with the initiation of the Municipality of Podujevo led by Mayor Agim Veliu, held the electoral assembly with the board of directors who supported the long term project presented by Nexhat Dumnica as President and Tahir Batatina as chief of the technical staff and thus began the mission towards the Football Superleague of Kosovo, with clear ambitions and clear organization. In the first meeting of the football fund, club leaders Nexhat Dumnica and Muhamet Hasani presented their plan for a revived Llapi financially and with new goals.

Stadium

The club has played its home games at the Zahir Pajaziti Stadium is a multi-purpose stadium in Podujevo, Kosovo. The stadium has a capacity of 5,000 people all seater.

European record

Players

Current squad

Other players under contract

Retired numbers

Personnel

Historical list of coaches

Club records
 Most capped player:  Benjamin Emini 106
 Most goals:  Mirlind Daku 27
 Youngest Goal Scorer:  Muhamet Hyseni (18 years 08 months 12 days)
 Oldest Goal Scorer: Sebino Plaku (34 years 05 months 17 days)

Football Superleague of Kosovo
2019/2020  - 6th
2018/2019  - 3rd
2017/2018  - 3rd

Cup record

Kosovar Cup

Winners (2): 2020–21, 2021–22

References

External links
 

Llapi
1932 establishments in Yugoslavia
Association football clubs established in 1932
Llapi
Llapi